Barbora Janíčková (born 1 May 2000) is a Czech swimmer. She competed in the 2020 Summer Olympics.

References

2000 births
Living people
Sportspeople from Brno
Swimmers at the 2020 Summer Olympics
Czech female swimmers
Olympic swimmers of the Czech Republic